This is a list of Estonian television related events from 1987.

Events

Debuts

Television shows

Ending this year

Births
27 January - Mikk Jürjens, actor, singer and TV presenter 
4 April - Lauri Pedaja, actor and hairdresser
23 November - Vallo Kirs, actor

Deaths